Elmo: The Musical was a musical Sesame Street segment that began airing in Season 43. It appears in every episode until Season 46, where it alternated with Elmo's World.

In the segment, Elmo teaches math skills while imagining himself in different musical situations, such as "Sea Captain the Musical", "Mountain Climber the Musical", "Prince Elmo the Musical" and "President the Musical". Joining Elmo in his adventures is Velvet, a talking set of curtains, and a series of animal and Anything Muppet friends.

The segment's theme song was composed by Adam Schlesinger, while the legal registration ascribes lyrics to six of the Elmo: The Musical staff writers: Molly Boylan, Annie Evans, Belinda Ward, Joey Mazzarino, Luis Santeiro, and Christine Ferraro. The song was nominated for the 2013 Daytime Emmy Awards in the "Outstanding Original Song – Children's and Animation" category, along with "I'm the Queen of Nacho Picchu" from the Guacamole the Musical segment.

Interactive game versions of some of the segments appear on the Sesame Street website. Elements of the segment (including Velvet) appear in the Sesame Street Live show "Can't Stop Singing".

Starting in the fall of 2015, segments used in the hour edits of re-run episodes and new additions starting with season 46 now run around 7 minutes long.

Replacing Elmo's World
Production on the Elmo's World segments had ceased in the late 2000s, the last new segment airing as part of the 2009–10 season. The segment was meant to appeal to kids younger than the target age of the show (two years and younger). Executive producer Carol-Lynn Parente was not too pleased with the success it received, as it was targeting an age the show's curriculum was not designed for. The "block format" experiment of season 40 proved to be a ratings hit, attracting more children between the ages of 3–4, leaving the Elmo's World segment as the youngest-skewing portion of the program, something Parente wished to change even before production halted.

Development 
In June 2011, Joey Mazzarino and the other writers began developing new ideas for the new segment. One idea was to have Elmo go on road trips using his tricycle. Mazzarino stated Elmo's character was all about his excited view of the world and large imagination and they decided to go with an idea based on those characteristics. The idea of a musical segment came around and with the success of musical programs like High School Musical and Glee, the writers decided it was a good idea to move forward with.

Episodes

Series overview
<onlyinclude>

Season 1 (2012-2013)

Season 2 (2013-2014)

Season 3 (2014)

Season 4 (2016)

Production 
Each episode took a day to film; the initial segments were filmed between January and February 2012. All the material was filmed in front of a bluescreen, with the performers dressed in blue to allow characters like Elmo to appear full-bodied. Magnetic Dreams Animation Studio, known for producing other animated segments for the show, provides the CGI elements of the segment, including the backgrounds and animated characters like Velvet. Each episode costs approximately $275,000 to produce.

International 
In late 2013, the segments began airing on ABC KIDS in Australia and well as in Germany on KI.KA as a separate mini-series. In 2014, the segments began airing in Dutch as part of the Sesamstraat mini-series, 10 voor.

Cast 
 Kevin Clash (as Elmo, seasons 43–44)
 Ryan Dillon (as Elmo, season 45–46)
 Pam Arciero
 Jennifer Barnhart
 Fran Brill
 Tyler Bunch
 Leslie Carrara-Rudolph (as Velvet and various others)
 Stephanie D'Abruzzo
 Eric Jacobson
 John Kennedy
 Tim Lagasse
 Peter Linz
 Jim Martin
 Joey Mazzarino
 Paul McGinnis
 Carmen Osbahr
 Martin P. Robinson
 David Rudman
 Caroll Spinney
 John Tartaglia
 Matt Vogel
 Steve Whitmire

See also
 The Not-Too-Late Show with Elmo
 List of Sesame Street recurring segments

Sources 
 Stephanie D'Abruzzo's official website
"Sesame Street Adds 'Elmo the Musical. The New York Times. September 13, 2012.
 'Sesame Street' Has Best Ratings Since 2007. Huffingtonpost.com. May 25, 2012

References 

Sesame Street segments
Sesame Street
2012 American television series debuts
2010s American children's television series
2020s American children's television series
2010s preschool education television series
2020s preschool education television series
American preschool education television series
American television shows featuring puppetry
Television series about children